Rikitarō Fujisawa (Japanese: 藤沢 利喜太郎, Fujisawa Rikitarō; 12 October 1861 – 23 December 1933) was a Japanese mathematician. During the Meiji era he was instrumental in reforming mathematics education in Japan and establishing the ideas of European mathematics in Japan.

Biography
Born in Sado Province as the eldest son of Oyano Fujisawa, vassal of the shōgun, Rikitarō Fujisawa graduated in 1882 from the Faculty of Sciences of the University of Tokyo. From 1883 to 1887 he studied mathematics in Europe. After study at the University of London and the Humboldt University of Berlin, he studied at the University of Strasbourg (then a part of Germany) and in 1886 attained his doctorate with a dissertation on partial differential equations under the direction of Elwin Christoffel. In 1887 Fujisawa was appointed the second titular professor of mathematics at the University of Tokyo.

Fujisawa, who himself attended the seminary of Theodor Reye in Strasbourg, introduced the institution of the research seminary based on the German model early on. He was a teacher and mentor of several Japanese mathematicians who gained international reputations. His most famous student was Teiji Takagi. In 1921, Fujisawa retired from the University of Tokyo and, beginning in 1925, was twice appointed to the Japanese House of Peers but died in the early part of his second term.

Two of his sons achieved prominence in Japanese society. One of his brothers, Iwao Fujisawa, was a rear admiral in the Imperial Japanese Navy.

Selected publications

 (theory of life insurance)

 (general election reader, or reading guide) This publication deals with issues related to the elections for the Japanese House of Representatives in the late 1920s.

 (Dr. Fujisawa memorial collection)

References

External links
 
Dr. Rikitaro Fujisawa, photo from Bain News Service, U.S. Library of Congress

19th-century Japanese mathematicians
20th-century Japanese mathematicians
Members of the House of Peers (Japan)
People of Meiji-period Japan
University of Tokyo alumni
University of Strasbourg alumni
Academic staff of the University of Tokyo
1861 births
1933 deaths